Christopher Xavier Freebury (born  in Derby) is a British male weightlifter, competing in the 69 kg category and representing England and Great Britain at international competitions. He represented England at the 2010 and 2014 Commonwealth Games. He competed at world championships, most recently at the 2014 World Weightlifting Championships. His coach is Cyril Martin.

He began weightlifting because he was too short to play water polo. He first tried weightlifting at age 12. He took it up competitively at age 16.

Major results

References

External links
 

1989 births
Living people
British male weightlifters
Sportspeople from Derby
Weightlifters at the 2010 Commonwealth Games
Weightlifters at the 2014 Commonwealth Games
Commonwealth Games competitors for England
21st-century British people